ARDF is a four-letter acronym that can have several meanings:

 Airborne Radio Direction Finding, a military technology used for battlefield reconnaissance
 Alaska Resource Data Files, published by the United States Geological Survey
 Amateur radio direction finding
 Automatic Radio Direction Finder
 Automatic Reversing Document Feeder, a type of automatic document feeder